The mathematical term fundamental sequence can refer to:

In analysis, Cauchy sequence.
In discrete mathematics and computer science, Unary coding.
In set theory, a fundamental sequence for an ordinal is a sequence of ordinals approaching the limit ordinal from below.